Cheltenham Spa railway station is a railway station serving Cheltenham in  Gloucestershire, England. Situated on the Bristol-Birmingham main line, it is managed by Great Western Railway (despite most services being operated by CrossCountry, which does not manage any stations) and is about one mile from the town centre. The official name of the town is simply Cheltenham, but, when the station was renamed in 1925, the London, Midland and Scottish Railway chose to add Spa to the station name.   The station is a key regional interchange and is the fifth busiest rail station in South West England.

History

The first railway to Cheltenham was the broad-gauge Cheltenham and Great Western Union Railway (C&GWUR), authorised by Act of Parliament in 1836, and opened between Cheltenham and Gloucester in 1840. In the same year, the Birmingham and Gloucester Railway (B&GR) opened its line between Cheltenham and Bromsgrove, whence trains ran on mixed-gauge tracks to Gloucester. Both railways had their own stations, but the B&GR station, which was then on the edge of the town and was named Lansdown after a housing development in that area, is the only one remaining. The buildings were designed by the architect Samuel Daukes and the station was opened by the B&GR on 24 June 1840 as Lansdown.

The C&GWUR was taken over by the Great Western Railway in 1844, and the B&GR by the Midland Railway in 1846. Within the town, there were three other passenger railway stations: Malvern Road, St James's and Cheltenham South and Leckhampton; there was also High Street Halt and the Racecourse Platform, open only on race days.

From 1892 there was a route from Cheltenham to the docks at Southampton, via Andoversford and the Midland and South Western Junction Railway.

The station was renamed Cheltenham Spa (Lansdown) on 1 February 1925 by the London, Midland and Scottish Railway, and renamed again as Cheltenham Spa by British Railways at some point after 1 January 1948.

Stationmasters

William Turnbull 1844–1872 (discharged for failing to report his ticket collector for fraud)
Joseph Vizard Bendall 1872–1900 (formerly station master at Harpenden)
Henry Ward 1900–1907 (afterwards station master at Bedford)
Horace E. Horne 1907–1909 (formerly station master at Harpenden)
Charles Williams 1910–1913 (formerly station master at Hay)
G.Preston Heggs 1913–1914 (afterwards station master at Sheffield)
Henry Pitt 1914-1918 (formerly station master at Rushden)
Arthur Ernest Chandler 1918–1928 (afterwards station master at Burton upon Trent)
John Richard Needham from 1956 (formerly station master at Lancaster Green Ayre)

Services

Cheltenham Spa station is served by approx 8 to 12 trains every hour during the daytime on Mondays to Saturdays (less frequent on Sundays).

Great Western Railway operate approx hourly Cheltenham Spa –  via  services.

Great Western Railway also operates local services on the Bristol (Temple Meads/Parkway) to Gloucester, Cheltenham Spa and Worcester Shrub Hill route.

All three of these services run hourly each way, giving a net half-hourly service to Bristol Temple Meads and three departures per hour to/from Birmingham New Street.

Transport for Wales operate approximately hourly with a Maesteg via , Cardiff Central,  and Chepstow to Gloucester and Cheltenham Spa service.

Redevelopment proposals

In early 2012 Cheltenham Council released a Railway Station concept statement, promoting various enhancements at the station.  In March 2013 the Gloucestershire Local Transport Body (LTB) asked for bids from the local area for transport projects which could be funded in the period 2015 to 2019. A proposal to significantly enhance the station, with new passenger facilities and install a new south-facing bay platform enabling trains to reverse was put forward.

During the development and optioneering phase of the submission, it was that two new bay platforms were required. This configuration formed the basis of a station regeneration proposal that was submitted to the Gloucestershire Local Transport Body for consideration in early March 2013. Following short listing to stage 2, a second funding proposal was submitted on 10 May 2013. Cheltenham Spa Station and the other various transport scheme proposals were all published for public consultation on the LTB website on 13 May 2013.

In February 2014 the scheme was shelved after both Network Rail and train operator First Great Western refused to back the portion of the proposals relating to the additional platforms, though they were supportive of the need to upgrade other passenger facilities (station building & taxi/bus interchange improvements and better car parking).

References

Further reading

Station
Railway stations in Gloucestershire
DfT Category C1 stations
Former Midland Railway stations
Railway stations in Great Britain opened in 1840
Railway stations served by Transport for Wales Rail
Railway stations served by CrossCountry
Railway stations served by Great Western Railway
Transport in Cheltenham